The following is an outline of 1988 in spaceflight.

Launches 

|}

Deep-space rendezvous
There were no deep-space rendezvous in 1988.

References

Footnotes

 
Spaceflight by year